Ma'nu VII was king of Edessa and/or Osrhoene from . He was the first of the Abgar dynasty to be restored after Abgar VII supported a Parthian revolt against the Roman Emperor Trajan.

Notes

Citations

References 

 

Kings of Osroene
2nd-century Arabs